Schwank is a surname. Notable people with the surname include:

Eduardo Schwank (born 1986), Argentine tennis player
Judy Schwank (born 1951), American politician
Wally Schwank (c. 1912 – 2009), American football coach and athletics administrator

See also
21738 Schwank, a main-belt asteroid